Sugar Grove Run is a stream in the U.S. state of Pennsylvania.

Sugar Grove Run was named from a grove of sugar trees near its course.

References

Rivers of Pennsylvania
Rivers of Huntingdon County, Pennsylvania